Moel-y-don is a community in Llanddaniel Fab, Ynys Môn, Wales, which is 126 miles (202.7 km) from Cardiff and 208.1 miles (334.9 km) from London.

References

See also 
 List of localities in Wales by population

Villages in Anglesey